Lichnofugia is an Asian subgenus of bush crickets in the tribe Agraeciini: now placed within the genus Anelytra; they belonging to the 'conehead' subfamily Conocephalinae.

Species
The Orthoptera Species File lists:
 Lichnofugia cornuta Ingrisch, 1998
 Lichnofugia petria Ingrisch, 1998
 Lichnofugia rufa Ingrisch, 1998
 Lichnofugia symfioma Ingrisch, 1998
 Lichnofugia umshingensis (Hajong, 2014)

References

External links 
 
 

Conocephalinae
Insect subgenera
Orthoptera of Asia